Route 22 is a  secondary state route within the U.S. state of Connecticut. Route 22 is an L-shaped road that is signed east–west from Hamden to the western junction of Route 80 in North Branford, and north–south to its eastern terminus in Guilford. It was designated in 1951 as a bypass of New Haven, connecting the Wilbur Cross Parkway and Route 80.

Route description
Route 22 is mostly a two-lane minor arterial road, except in sections where it overlaps other state highways. It starts at Route 10 in the Mount Carmel section of Hamden heading east as Ives Street. Route 22 then turns south on Broadway  later, becoming Davis Road as it enters the town of North Haven. It turns left on Ridge Road then continues east as Bishop Street towards North Haven center. It intersects the Wilbur Cross Parkway at Exit 63 then meets with U.S. Route 5. The US 5 and Route 22 overlap (0.7 miles long) crosses over the Quinnipiac River and I-91 (with a partial interchange at Exit 11) along the Route 5/22 Connector. At the next intersection, Route 5 heads north, Route 103 begins south, and Route 22 continues east towards the Clintonville section of North Haven as Clintonville Road.

Route 22 then enters the town of North Branford, passing the southern end of Route 150 before entering the village of Northford. It briefly overlaps Route 17 (Middletown Avenue) as it shifts cardinal direction, heading southward along Forest Road. The road name changes to Norton Hill Road at the Guilford town line,  and quickly ends after  at U.S. Route 1.

The Route 5/22 Connector in North Haven is also known as Officer Timothy W. Laffin Memorial Highway.  Officer Laffin is the only North Haven police officer to have died in the line of duty, having succumbed to his injuries following a patrol car pursuit accident in May 1980.

History
Route 22 was established in 1951 as a bypass of New Haven, connecting the newly opened Wilbur Cross Parkway with Route 80. Prior to that the portion of modern Route 22 between Route 5 and Route 17 was former Route 168; the portion between Route 17 and Route 80 originally belonged to Route 139; and the portion between Route 80 and Route 1 was the former Route 141.

In 1973, a section in North Haven between State Street and Washington Avenue was rerouted from its original alignment along Broadway to the new Route 5/22 Connector, including a partial interchange with I-91 (at Exit 11).

Junction list

Truck route

Truck Route 22 is the only bannered route in the entire state. In 1972, trucks were prohibited from traveling the portion of Route 22 between Whitney Avenue (Route 10) in Hamden and State Street (Route 5) in North Haven. Trucks following Route 22 westbound are currently directed to follow State Street south (US 5) until Dixwell Avenue (SR 717) then west until Whitney Avenue (Route 10) and north up to the Route 22 junction.

References

External links

022
Transportation in New Haven County, Connecticut